Nemorilla floralis is a species of tachinid fly.

Description
Thorax show a few black stripes, with a broader central stripe. Head and body are hairy. Body color range from pale grey or beige to black. The abdomen is speckled. Wings are partially darkened.

Adults can be found from May to July. These flies lay their eggs inside a living host where larvae develop.

Hosts
This species is a parasitoid of various butterflies and micro-moths (Arctiidae, Noctuidae, Choreutidae, Nymphalidae, Oecophoridae and Pyralidae).

Distribution
This species can be found in Austria, Belarus, Belgium, Bulgaria, Croatia, Czech Republic, Denmark, Finland, France, Germany, Hungary, Italy, Latvia, Lithuania, North Macedonia, Poland, Romania, Russia, Slovakia,  Slovenia, Sweden, Switzerland, Netherlands, Ukraine, United Kingdom, Yugoslavia.

References

Exoristinae
Diptera of Europe
Insects described in 1810